"MegaMan" is a song by American rapper Lil Wayne, from his ninth studio album, Tha Carter IV. Although not released as a single, the song peaked at number 52 on the Billboard Hot 100. "MegaMan" was the last song recorded for the album and was named after its producer MegaMan.

Background and recording 
Producer MegaMan initially got in touch with Lil Wayne through a mutual relative–Young Jeezy's DJ Folk. MegaMan submitted a beat to Wayne, which he had originally created for Jay-Z and Kanye West. Wayne liked the beat and wanted to record a collaboration with singer Amy Winehouse over it. Eventually the record didn't make the final cut for Tha Carter IV.

After ending the recording sessions for the album, Lil Wayne reopened them, looking for a "hard track". MegaMan created a new beat specifically for Wayne. The track, originally called "Hold Back", was later given the working title "MegaMan" during the recording sessions. The name was eventually kept for the final track list.

Chart performance

References 

2011 songs
Lil Wayne songs
Songs written by Lil Wayne